Howard Harris may refer to:
 
Howard Harris (cricketer) (born 1970), Jamaican cricketer
Howard Harris (writer) (1912–1986), American comedy writer
Howard Harris (wrestler) (born 1958), 1980 NCAA National Champion from Oregon State University